Hashtpar (also known as, Hashpar, Hashtpar-e Tavalesh, and Tālesh) is a city and capital of Talesh County, Gilan Province, Iran.  At the 2016 census, its population was 54,178, in 15,688 families.

The Iranian dialect of Hashtpar is a dialect of Talysh language Notable residents include Mitra Farazandeh.

Language 
Linguistic composition of the city.

References

Populated places in Talesh County

Cities in Gilan Province

Azerbaijani settlements in Gilan Province

Talysh settlements in Gilan Province

Kurdish settlements in Gilan Province